Although Cartoon Network stopped ordering episodes, Funimation continued to dub the series direct-to-DVD and episodes 1–4 and 53–83 were released on eleven DVD volumes released between August 24, 2004 and July 26, 2005. Funimation then redesigned its DVD volumes and episodes 1–52 were released in eight DVD volumes between February 21, 2006 and May 29, 2007. The series was later released in five seasonal DVD boxes between July 22, 2008 and May 12, 2009 containing 130 episodes in total. The seasonal boxes were then re-released as a part of Funimation's Viridian Edition line between July 14, 2009 and March 23, 2010. Then they were re-released as part of Funimation's Super Amazing Value Edition (S.A.V.E.) line on July 23, 2013.

Seasons overview 
These "seasons" are based on the Japanese DVDs released by Shogakukan starting on October 25, 2000. (see Home media release section) In Japan, Case Closed runs continuously on TV with very few weeks off.

Episode list

Season 1: 1996

Season 2: 1996–1997

Season 3: 1997

Season 4: 1997–1998

Season 5: 1998–1999

Season 6: 1999

Season 7: 1999–2000

Season 8: 2000–2001

Season 9: 2001

Season 10: 2001–2002

Season 11: 2002–2003

Season 12: 2003–2004

Season 13: 2004–2005

Season 14: 2005–2006

Season 15: 2006–2007

Home media release

Region 2
The Region 2 DVD compilations of the Detective Conan anime are released by Shogakukan and grouped by parts.

Region 1
The Region 1 DVD compilations of the Case Closed anime are released by Funimation Entertainment. Although Cartoon Network stopped ordering episodes, Funimation continued to dub the series direct-to-DVD and episodes 1–4 and 53–83 were released eleven DVD volumes released between August 24, 2004 and July 26, 2005. Funimation then redesigned its DVD volumes and episodes 1–52 were released in eight DVD volumes between February 21, 2006 and May 29, 2007. The series was later released in five seasonal DVD boxes between July 22, 2008 and May 12, 2009 containing 130 episodes in total. The seasonal boxes were then re-released as a part of Funimation's Viridian Edition line between July 14, 2009 and March 23, 2010.

Notes

 The episode's numbering as followed in Japan
 The episode's numbering as followed by Funimation Entertainment
 The episodes were aired as a single hour long episode in Japan
 The episodes were aired as a single two-hour long episode in Japan
 The episodes were aired as a single two-hour and thirty minutes long episode in Japan
 These episodes are part of the second season of Case Closed
 These episodes are part of the third season of Case Closed
 These episodes are part of the fourth season of Case Closed
 These episodes are part of the fifth season of Case Closed

References
General

Specific

External links

Lists of television episodes